The Former Residence of Deng Xiaoping was built in the late Qing dynasty (19th century). It is located in Paifang Village of Xiexing Town, Guang'an District, Guang'an City, Sichuan, China.

History
In the late Qing dynasty (19th century), the house was built by Deng Xiaoping's great-grandfather Deng Xinzao and grandfather Deng Keda.

Deng Xiaoping was born here on 22 August 1904, in the 37th year of the Guangxu reign. He lived here for about 15 years.

In July 1997, it was listed as a National Patriotic Education Base by the Propaganda Department of the Communist Party of China.

In February 1998, the CPC General Secretary Jiang Zemin wrote "Deng Xiaoping's Former Residence" on the horizontal tablet.

On 25 June 2001, it was listed as a Major Historical and Cultural Site Protected at the National Level by the State Council of China.

On 13 August 2004, the CPC General Secretary Hu Jintao attended the unveiling of the statue of Deng Xiaoping.

References

Buildings and structures in Guang'an
Traditional folk houses in China
Tourist attractions in Guang'an
Major National Historical and Cultural Sites in Sichuan
Qing dynasty architecture